Nick Yates is an Australian vending entrepreneur and businessman who is currently living and doing business in the United States.

Business history 
On February 8, 2010, Yates formed a vending machine franchise called Fresh Healthy Vending in San Diego. Fresh Healthy Vending has been active in providing healthy vending products to schools, as encouraged by the Healthy, Hunger-Free Kids Act of 2010, which placed a prohibition on high-calorie junk food in school vending machines. In 2010 Fresh Healthy Vending became a publicly traded company trading under the stock symbol VEND. Fresh Healthy Vending was nominated by both Entrepreneur and Inc magazine.

Fresh Healthy Vending failed to disclose Yates' litigation and bankruptcy history in its franchise disclosure documents. As a result, the California Department of Business Oversight revoked Fresh Healthy Vending's ability to sell franchises in California and then ordered the company to offer rescissions to franchisees in that state.

Yates was the chairman of Generation NEXT Franchise Brands, a San Diego-based franchisor whose franchises include Reis & Irvy's, 19 Degrees Frozen Yogurt and Generation NEXT Vending Robots Inc. Nick Yates' Reis & Irvy's frozen yogurt vending machines accept cryptocurrency. Yates resigned from Generation Next in October 2019

In September 2022 Nick Yates launched 99 Innovations a new robotic soft-serve vending kiosk company. The multi-tiered model allows established vending industry operators, food service companies, and business owners access to robotic soft-serve equipment.

References

External links
 Profile
 

Living people
Australian mining entrepreneurs
Year of birth missing (living people)